is a railway station in the city of Morioka, Iwate Prefecture, Japan, operated by the Iwate Ginga Railway.

Lines
Trains of the JR East Hanawa Line, which officially terminates at  usually continue on to Morioka Station, stopping at all intermediate stations, including Shibutami Station.

Station layout
Shibutami Station has two opposed side platforms connected to the station building by a footbridge. The station is staffed.

Platforms

History
Shibutami Station was opened on 1 December 1950. The station was absorbed into the JR East network upon the privatization of the Japanese National Railways (JNR) on 1 April 1987 and was transferred to the Iwate Ginga Railway on 1 September 2002.

Passenger statistics
In fiscal 2015, the station was used by an average of 660 passengers daily.

Surrounding area
 Kitakami River
Shibutami Post Office
Takuboku Ishikawa Memorial Museum

References

External links

  

Railway stations in Iwate Prefecture
Iwate Galaxy Railway Line
Railway stations in Japan opened in 1950
Morioka, Iwate